The 1911–12 French Ice Hockey Championship was the third edition of the French Ice Hockey Championship, the national ice hockey championship in France. It was the first since 1908. Club des Patineurs de Paris won their second championship.

Final
 Chamonix Hockey Club - Club des Patineurs de Paris 1:9 (1:4, 0:5)

External links
Season on hockeyarchives.info

French
1911–12 in French ice hockey
Ligue Magnus seasons